
Laguna Sajama is a lake in the Oruro Department, Bolivia. Its surface area is 0.3 km².

References 

Lakes of Oruro Department